Wygiełzów  is a village in the administrative district of Gmina Babice, within Chrzanów County, Lesser Poland Voivodeship, in southern Poland.

The village has a population of 645.

References

External links 

Villages in Chrzanów County